Loren Yamilé Bahamonde Cabello (born June 4, 1987) is an Ecuadorian swimmer, who specialized in freestyle and butterfly events. She represented her nation Ecuador at the 2008 Summer Olympics, and has won a career total of three bronze medals in a major international competition, spanning the two editions of the South American Games (2002 and 2006). Moreover, she collected a total of sixteen national records in three freestyle events (50, 100, and 200).

Bahamonde competed for the Ecuadorian squad in the women's 50 m freestyle at the 2008 Summer Olympics in Beijing. Leading up to the Games, she cleared a FINA B-standard entry time of 26.32 from the Speedo Grand Challenge in Irvine, California, United States. Swimming in heat six, Bahamonde touched out Christel Simms of the Philippines to snatch a third spot by a tenth-second deficit (0.10), in a time of 26.54 seconds. Bahamonde failed to advance into the semifinals, as she shared a forty-fourth-place tie with Hong Kong's Elaine Chan in the prelims.

References

External links
NBC 2008 Olympics profile

1987 births
Living people
Ecuadorian female swimmers
Olympic swimmers of Ecuador
Swimmers at the 2008 Summer Olympics
Female butterfly swimmers
Ecuadorian female freestyle swimmers
Pan American Games competitors for Ecuador
Swimmers at the 2003 Pan American Games
Sportspeople from Guayaquil
South American Games bronze medalists for Ecuador
South American Games medalists in swimming
Competitors at the 2002 South American Games
Competitors at the 2006 South American Games
21st-century Ecuadorian women
20th-century Ecuadorian women